Zhang Hao (Chinese: 张浩; born 23 May 1994) is a Chinese football player who currently plays as a midfielder or centre-back for Kunshan.

Club career
Zhang started his professional football career in July 2013 when he joined Chinese Super League side Shanghai Shenxin. On 20 July 2014, Zhang made his debut for Shanghai Shenxin in the 2014 Chinese Super League against Dalian Aerbin, coming on as a substitute for Yang Jiawei in the 67th minute. He was utilized very sparsely and was part of the squad that was relegated to the second tier at the end of the 2015 Chinese Super League campaign.   

On 28 February 2019, Zhang transferred to his hometown club Heilongjiang FC in the China League One. He would make his debut in a league game on 10 March 2019 against Shaanxi Chang'an Athletic  that ended in a 1-0 victory. After three seasons with Heilongjiang he transferred to second tier club Kunshan and was part of the squad that won the division and promotion to the top tier at the end of the 2022 China League One campaign.

Career statistics 
Statistics accurate as of match played 24 December 2022.

Honours

Club
Kunshan
 China League One: 2022

References

External links
 

1994 births
Living people
Chinese footballers
Footballers from Heilongjiang
Shanghai Shenxin F.C. players
Heilongjiang Ice City F.C. players
Chinese Super League players
China League One players
Association football midfielders